The grain boundary diffusion coefficient is the diffusion coefficient of a diffusant along a grain boundary in a polycrystalline solid. It is a physical constant denoted , and it is important in understanding how grain boundaries affect atomic diffusivity. Grain boundary diffusion is a commonly observed route for solute migration in polycrystalline materials. It dominates the effective diffusion rate at lower temperatures in metals and metal alloys. Take the apparent self-diffusion coefficient for single-crystal and polycrystal silver, for example. At high temperatures, the coefficient   is the same in both types of samples.

Measurement 

The general way to measure grain boundary diffusion coefficients was suggested by Fisher. In the Fisher model, a grain boundary is represented as a thin layer of high-diffusivity uniform and isotropic slab embedded in a low-diffusivity isotropic crystal. The first equation represents diffusion in the volume, while the second shows diffusion along the grain boundary, respectively.

 where 

To solve the equation, Whipple introduced an exact analytical solution. He assumed a constant surface composition, and used a Fourier–Laplace transform to obtain a solution in integral form. The diffusion profile therefore can be depicted by the following equation.

To further determine , two common methods were used. The second technique is useful for comparing the relative  of different boundaries.

 Method 1: Suppose the slab was cut into a series of thin slices parallel to the sample surface, we measure the distribution of in-diffused solute in the slices, . Then we used the above formula that developed by Whipple to get .
 Method 2: To compare the length of penetration of a given concentration at the boundary  with the length of lattice penetration from the surface far from the boundary.

References

See also 

 Kirkendall effect
 Phase transformations in solids
 Mass diffusivity

Diffusion